Kolbotn I.L. - Wrestling is a sub-section under Kolbotn I.L., one of the largest sports clubs in Norway.  The club started wrestling in 1925 and organized Wrestling as a semi-autonomous sub-section in 1960.

Achievements
 1947 Reidar Merli, 2nd place in European Championship
 1948 Frithjof Clausen placed sixth at the Summer Olympics
 1985 Jon Rønningen, World Champion
 1985 Klaus Mysen, 3rd place in World Championship
 1986 Jon Rønningen, 2nd place in World Championship
 1986 Jon Rønningen, 3rd place in European Championship
 1987 Ine Barlie, World Champion
 1987 Lars Rønningen, 3rd place in World Championship
 1988 Jon Rønningen, Olympic Gold winner
 1988 Lars Rønningen, European Champion
 1988 Jon Rønningen, 2nd place in European Championship
 1989 Ine Barlie, 2nd place in World Championship
 1989 Kirsten Borgen, 2nd place in World Championship
 1989 Lars Rønningen, 2nd place in World Championship
 1990 Jon Rønningen, European Champion
 1990 Ine Barlie, 3rd place in World Championship
 1991 Ine Barlie, 2nd place in World Championship
 1991 Jon Rønningen, 3rd place in World Championship
 1992 Jon Rønningen, Olympic Gold winner
 1992 Ine Barlie, World Champion
 1992 Lars Rønningen, European Champion
 1993 Stig-Arild Kleven, 3rd place in European Championship
 1995 Mette Barlie, 2nd place in World Championship
 1997 Mette Barlie, 2nd place in World Championship

See also
 Kolbotn I.L.
 Kolbotn Football
 Kolbotn Handball

Sports teams in Norway